Clepsis zelleriana is a species of moth of the family Tortricidae. It is found in Turkmenistan.

References

Moths described in 1874
Clepsis